William Heathcote may refer to:

Sir William Heathcote, 1st Baronet (1693–1751), British merchant and politician
Sir William Heathcote, 5th Baronet (1801–1881), British politician
William Heathcote (1800 ship)